Emil Dimitriev (born 19 March 1979) is a Macedonian conservative politician, sociologist, and general secretary of the VMRO-DPMNE. He served as Prime Minister of Macedonia, following the resignation of Nikola Gruevski, from January 2016 to May 2017.

Prime Minister
Dimitriev was nominated in an interim capacity as Prime Minister of Macedonia on 15 January 2016, and he assumed office on 18 January, following the arranged pre-electoral resignation of Nikola Gruevski from the position, as part of the Przino Agreement.

References

1979 births
VMRO-DPMNE politicians
Living people
People from Probištip
Prime Ministers of North Macedonia